Matthew John Lushington Kirk (born 10 October 1960) is a British businessman and former diplomat. He was the British Ambassador to Finland from 22 August 2002, until he resigned from the Diplomatic Service in 2006 to take up a position as Director of External Relationships for Vodafone.

The youngest son of former Conservative MP Sir Peter Michael Kirk, he was educated at Felsted School and St John's College, Oxford. In 1989, he married Anna Thérèse Macey, with whom he has two daughters.

References

External links
British Embassy, Helsinki (during tenure of Matthew Kirk)

1960 births
Living people
Ambassadors of the United Kingdom to Finland